

The SECAT RG-75 (sometimes designated  SECAT 75T) was a light utility monoplane built in France shortly after World War II. It was a conventional cabin monoplane with two seats side-by-side. The wing was mounted high and was of fully cantilever design. The conventional undercarriage consisted of two fixed, divided main units plus a fixed tailskid. Power was supplied by a tractor-mounted piston engine that drove a two-bladed propeller. Construction was of wood throughout, covered in plywood.

History
Two prototypes, registered F-WBBX and F-WBBT were tested at the CEV at Brétigny-sur-Orge in 1947 by pilots Marcel Joannès and Guy Buteau. Shortly afterwards, F-WBBT was displayed together with other SECAT designs at the Semaine de l'Aviation légère (light aviation week) held at Toussus-le-Noble from 22 April 1947 but was already somewhat outdated by the standards of the time. SECAT produced no further examples.

Specifications

Notes

References
 
 
 
 

1940s French civil utility aircraft
SECAT aircraft
High-wing aircraft
Single-engined tractor aircraft
Aircraft first flown in 1947